The Academic Pentathlon (USAP) is an academic competition involving five academic fields of study (math, social sciences, science, literature, and fine arts). It is run by the USAD (United States Academic Decathlon). The exact topics involved vary from year to year, but typically include topics from both the sciences and humanities. At the national Academic Pentathlon competitions, schools from both the United States and China compete, but in different divisions. In 2014 and 2015, Austin Academy from Garland, Texas were gold and silver overall in the 8th and 7th grade divisions, respectively. In 2016, Fairmont Private Schools of Anaheim, California won 1st and 2nd place. In 2017, 2018, and 2019, Rio Calaveras Elementary School from Stockton, California, won gold in both the 7th and 8th grade divisions.

See also 
 Academic administration
 Academic Decathlon
 Academic Games
 International Mathematical Olympiad
 International Science Olympiad

References

External links 
 http://academicevents.ocde.us/pentathlon.htm
 https://web.archive.org/web/20080705034822/http://alaskapentathlon.org/
 http://www.txacadec.org/
 https://www.stocktonusd.net/site/default.aspx?PageType=3&DomainID=35&ModuleInstanceID=14780&ViewID=6446EE88-D30C-497E-9316-3F8874B3E108&RenderLoc=0&FlexDataID=11720&PageID=63
 https://www.usad.org/Pentathlon/Pentathlon-Results.aspx
 https://www.usad.org/Pentathlon.aspx
 United States Academic Decathlon
 United States
 China
 Anaheim, California
 Stockton, California
 California
 Garland ISD
 Garland, Texas

Competitions